Minamino (written: 南野 lit. "south plain") is a Japanese surname. Notable people with the surname include:

, Japanese professional wrestler
, Japanese footballer
, Japanese idol, singer and actress

Fictional characters
, a protagonist of the anime series Suite PreCure
, a character in the anime series AKB0048

See also
Minamino Station, a railway station in Shōnai, Yamagata Prefecture, Japan

Japanese-language surnames